Rabble Starkey (1987) is a novel by Lois Lowry. It won the 1987 Josette Frank Award.

In the novel, 12-year-old Rabble Starkey's single mother Sweet-Hosanna is hired by the Bigelow family to take care of the children while Mrs. Bigelow is, due to crushing depression, unable to look after them herself. As time passes by, Rabble feels she's finally found a true home. However, soon she and her mother start to question what is best for them.

References

External links
Description of the novel from Lois Lowry's website

1987 American novels
American children's novels
Golden Kite Award-winning works
Novels by Lois Lowry
1987 children's books